Cantoniellus is a genus of beetles in the family Buprestidae, containing the following species:

 Cantoniellus cephalicus (Kerremans, 1892)
 Cantoniellus kubani Kalashian, 2004

References

Buprestidae genera